2Q or 2-Q may refer to:

 The second quarter of a calendar year (April, May, June) or fiscal year
2Q, IATA code for Air Cargo Carriers
F3D-2Q, a model of Douglas F3D Skyknight
WV-2Q, a model of Lockheed EC-121 Warning Star
2q, an arm of Chromosome 2 (human)

See also
Q2 (disambiguation)